Ballets Russes is a 2005 American feature documentary film about the dancers of the Ballet Russe de Monte-Carlo. It was directed by Dayna Goldfine and Dan Geller, and featured Irina Baronova, Alicia Markova, George Zoritch, and Tatiana Riabouchinska, Tamara Tchinarova among others. It was narrated by Marian Seldes. It is distributed by Zeitgeist Films.

Dancers 
Dancers appearing in the film include:

 Alan Howard
 Alicia Markova
 Frederic Franklin
 George Zoritch
 Irina Baronova
 Marc Platt
 Maria Tallchief
 Mia Slavenska
 Miguel Terekhov
 Nathalie Krassovska
 Nina Novak
 Nini Theilade
 Raven Wilkinson
 Rochelle Zide
 Tamara Tchinarova 
 Tatiana Riabouchinska
 Tatiana Stepanova
 Wakefield Poole
 Yvonne Chouteau
 Yvonne Craig

Awards 
Ballets Russes was nominated for Best Documentary at the 2005 Gotham Awards, and winner of the Audience Award for Best Documentary at the 2005 Hamptons International Film Festival. The film came third in the Best Nonfiction Picture category at the National Society of Film Critics Awards 2005, and second in the Top Five Documentaries category at the National Board of Review Awards 2005.

References

External links 
 
 

2005 films
American documentary films
Documentary films about ballet
Ballets Russes and descendants
2005 documentary films
2000s English-language films
2000s American films